Hum Dono (Both of Us) is a 1961 Hindi film produced by Dev Anand and Navketan films. Amarjeet is credited as the film's director, but producer and star Dev Anand claimed that it was his brother Vijay Anand, who directed the film, based on his own script. The film stars Dev Anand in a double role, and also has Sadhana, Nanda and Leela Chitnis.

It was relaunched in colour after exactly 50 years on 4 February 2011.
The film is also known for its music by Jaidev and became a box office hit. The movie was later made in Telugu as Ramuni Minchina Ramudu with N. T. Rama Rao. Also a Bengali movie Uttarayan was made starring Uttam Kumar in the lead based on the novel by Tarashankar Bandopadhyay. Hum Dono's story is loosely based on Uttarayan. The movie is fondly remembered for its memorable lyrics by Sahir Ludhianvi and music by Jaidev.

Plot 

The film is set in India during the period of World War II. Anand is an unemployed but happy-go-lucky guy who is in love with a rich girl, Mita. Mita tells her father about Anand, and the next day Anand comes to meet him although he had to face an interview for a job. Mita's father insults Anand saying that on the one hand, he doesn't have enough money to feed Mita but he looks to be so irresponsible that instead of first facing an interview for getting an employment, he has come with a marriage proposal. Anand takes it personally and walks out. On the way back home he sees an Indian Army poster. Eager as he is to get a job, he quickly enrolls, much to the displeasure of his mother. Mita, not knowing what has happened between her father and Anand, visits his home and learns that Anand has left to serve in the Army. She tells his mother that, being her future daughter-in-law, she will stay with Anand's mother. Mita makes sure that Anand does not learn about her presence at his home and takes care of his mother.

Meanwhile, Anand gets trained and is posted in a war zone. At his camp, Anand befriends Major Verma, a man who looks just like him (except that he has a moustache). With time, a bond develops between the two. The Major tells Anand about his personal life, his wife Ruma and his mother. As fate would have it, Major Verma goes missing in the war, and is presumed dead. A telegram is sent to his family saying that they are unable to trace him.

On the other hand, Anand is promoted for his heroic acts. He returns home to find Mita there and learns of his mother's death. Anand envisions what Verma's family must be going through in his absence. He decides to break the news of the Major's death personally and visits their home. Upon seeing him, the Major's mother mistakes him for her son and hugs him. Ruma too is overjoyed. Anand tells the family doctor of his true identity, but the doctor advises Anand against telling Ruma the truth since Ruma suffers from heart disease and cannot bear emotional stress. To keep Ruma happy and stress-free, Anand has no choice but to play the part of Major Verma, and starts spending more and more time at Verma's home. Mita grows unhappy about Anand's continuous absence from home. Once, when she sees him at a temple with Ruma, she concludes that he is having an affair and leaves him.

At the same time, Anand is not comfortable with being close to Ruma. This pains Ruma and she asks him why he is so distant from her, and when they would have a child. Anand replies that the war has changed him and he would never have a child with her. However, Ruma starts to think that Major Verma no longer loves her and is having an extra-marital affair.

It is now revealed that the Major is alive, though he has lost a leg. He reaches home and finds Anand in his place. He misjudges him and believes that he is taking sexual advantage of Ruma. Major Verma ambushes Anand on a secluded street and tries to kill him. A scuffle ensues, and the attempt to shoot Anand fails. Anand explains that he is merely playing his part to keep Verma's family happy and his wife healthy. To convince the Major, Anand tells him to come to the temple the next day. He also communicates the same to Mita.

The next day, Anand comes to the temple with Ruma. As Major Verma and Mita secretly listen on, Ruma again complains to Anand about the lack of physical intimacy between them. Anand then asks her whether she would leave her husband if he were to become handicapped. Ruma's answer is an emphatic no.

At this point, the real Major Verma reveals himself and Ruma hugs him. Mita too understands the situation and reconciles with Anand. The two couples leave the temple and the film ends on a happy note.

Cast
Dev Anand in double role as Major Manohar Lal Verma and Capt. Anand.
Lalita Pawar as Major Manohar Lal Verma's mother
Sadhana as Mita, Capt. Anand's love interest
Nanda as Ruma, Major Manohar Lal Verma's wife
Leela Chitnis as Capt. Anand's mother
Gajanan Jagirdar as Mita's father (credited as Jagirdar)
Rashid Khan as John

Music
Music composed by Jaidev and lyrics by Sahir Ludhianvi.
"Abhi Na Jao Chhodkar" - Mohammed Rafi, Asha Bhosle
"Adhuri Aas Chhod Ke" - Mohammed Rafi, Asha Bhosle
"Allah Tero Naam Ishwar Tero Naam" - Lata Mangeshkar
"Jahan Mein Aisa Kaun Hai" - Asha Bhosle
"Kabhi Khud Pe Kabhi Haalaat Pe" - Mohammed Rafi
"Main Zindagi Ka Saath" - Mohammed Rafi
"Prabhu Tero Naam" - Lata Mangeshkar

Themes
Through the story of the two couples (Meeta and Anand, and Ruma and Major Verma), the movie depicts how insecurity can affect romantic relationships. Another theme touched upon is war, and its impact on the people's lives.

Nominations 
Filmfare Nomination for Best Actor-Dev Anand
Director Amarjeet was nominated for the Golden Bear at the 1962 Berlin International Film Festival.
The film has two superhit songs "Mai Zindagi ka saath nibhata chala gaya" and "kabhi khud pe, kabhi halat pe" by Mohammed Rafi and the Lata solo "Allah tero naam". It also has the evergreen duet "Abhi na jaao chhodkar" by Mohammad Rafi and Asha Bhosle.

Colourised version 
A colourised version of the film was released theatrically in 2011.

References

External links 
 

1961 films
1960s Hindi-language films
Indian war films
Hindi films remade in other languages
Indian Army in films
Indian World War II films